No.X is the second studio album by South-Korean singer Kim Jae-joong, released on 12 February 2016. The songs represent various genres, including Britpop, pop punk, post-grunge, blues, ballad and rock. It sold over 85,000 copies, making it the 9th most successful album in the first half of 2016 in South Korea. A music video for the title song, "Love You More" was released on 11 February 2016.

Track listing

References

2016 albums
Kakao M albums
Kim Jae-joong albums